

Buffalo Range Airport  is an airport serving Chiredzi, Masvingo Province, Zimbabwe.

Characteristics
The Chiredzi or Buffalo Range non-directional beacon (Ident: BI) is located on the field.

Accidents and incidents
6 January 1977: A Rhodesian Air Force Douglas C-47B, tail number R7034, hit power lines shortly after takeoff from the airport, crashing and killing all three occupants aboard.

See also
Chiredzi District
List of airports in Zimbabwe
Transport in Zimbabwe

References

External links

 Google Maps - Buffalo Range
OpenStreetMap - Buffalo Range
OurAirports - Buffalo Range

Airports in Zimbabwe
Buildings and structures in Masvingo Province
Chiredzi District